Shadrina is a rural locality (a village) in Beloyevskoye Rural Settlement, Kudymkarsky District, Perm Krai, Russia. The population was 187 as of 2010. There are 4 streets.

Geography 
Shadrina is located 3 km south of Kudymkar (the district's administrative centre) by road.

References 

Rural localities in Kudymkarsky District